Lieutenant-General Sir Charles Craufurd Fraser  (31 August 1829 – 7 June 1895) was a British recipient of the Victoria Cross, the highest and most prestigious award for gallantry in the face of the enemy that can be awarded to British and Commonwealth forces. He was also a Conservative politician.

Early life
Fraser was the third son of Sir James Fraser and his wife Charlotte Anne Craufurd. He joined the 7th Hussars (The Queen's Own), British Army as a cornet in 1847, became lieutenant in 1850 and captain in 1854. On 5 January 1858 he became orderly officer for Brigadier Campbell at Munseata near Allahabad and was promoted to major on 20 July 1858.

Victoria Cross
Fraser was 29 years old, and a major in the 7th Hussars (The Queen's Own)  during the Indian Mutiny when the following deed took place on 31 December 1858 at the River Raptee, India for which he was awarded the VC:

He was also awarded the Royal Humane Society's Medal 1st Class.

Later career

Fraser transferred to the 11th Hussars in 1859 and became commanding officer as lieutenant colonel in 1861. He became colonel in 1866 and was commandant at headquarters during the Abyssinian War. He was mentioned in despatches and awarded CB. In 1868 he became colonel of the 8th King's Royal Irish Hussars and was promoted to major-general in 1870. He was aide-de-camp to the Duke of Cambridge lord-lieutenant of Ireland, from 1873 to 1877. In 1880 he became inspector-general of cavalry in Ireland until 1884 and was later in command of the cavalry at Aldershot. He retired with the rank of lieutenant general in 1886.

In 1885 Fraser was elected Member of Parliament for Lambeth North. He was knighted in 1891 and held the Lambeth seat until 1892.

In 1895 Fraser died in Sloane Street London at the age of 65 and was buried in Brompton Cemetery, London, on the east side of the main entrance path from the north entrance.

References

External links

 Location of grave and VC medal (Brompton Cemetery)
 

1829 births
1895 deaths
Military personnel from London
British Army lieutenant generals
British recipients of the Victoria Cross
Indian Rebellion of 1857 recipients of the Victoria Cross
Knights Commander of the Order of the Bath
Burials at Brompton Cemetery
7th Queen's Own Hussars officers
Conservative Party (UK) MPs for English constituencies
UK MPs 1885–1886
UK MPs 1886–1892
British military personnel of the Abyssinian War
11th Hussars officers
8th King's Royal Irish Hussars officers
Younger sons of baronets
19th-century British people
British Army recipients of the Victoria Cross